Spallanzani may refer to:

Lazzaro Spallanzani (1729-1799), an Italian Catholic priest, biologist and physiologist; and things named for him:
Lazzaro Spallanzani National Institute for Infectious Diseases
Spallanzani (lunar crater)
Spallanzani (Martian crater)
Spallanzani Point, Antarctica
10350 Spallanzani, a main belt asteroid
Marco Spallanzani, a teacher of economic history at the University of Florence